Every Trick in the Book is the fourth album by the American heavy metal band Ice Nine Kills, released on December 4, 2015 by Fearless Records. It is the band's first release through Fearless Records and their fourth overall. Each track on the album is based on a piece of literature. Some examples of the source material are: Strange Case of Dr Jekyll and Mr Hyde ("Me, Myself & Hyde"), Dracula ("Bloodbath & Beyond"), The Exorcist ("Communion of the Cursed"), and Romeo & Juliet ("Star-Crossed Enemies"). The album peaked at number 122 on the US Billboard 200, selling over 7,300 albums in its first week. This is the last album the band released to feature Conor Sullivan on drums.

Track listing

Chart performance

References

2015 albums
Fearless Records albums
Ice Nine Kills albums
Concept albums
Music based on books